Samuel Shaw (1819–?) was a notable New Zealand labour reformer. He was born in Littlebury, Essex, England in about 1819.

References

1819 births
New Zealand activists
English emigrants to New Zealand
Year of death missing